Tevilat Kelim, in Judaism, is the immersion of certain types of culinary utensils in a mikveh, on the occasion of their being acquired from a non-Jew.

Source
It is based upon : "Howbeit the gold, and the silver, the brass, the iron, the tin, and the lead, every thing that may abide the fire, ye shall make to go through the fire, and it shall be clean; nevertheless it shall be purified with the water of sprinkling; and all that abideth not the fire ye shall make to go through the water."

Jewish ritual purity law
Positive Mitzvoth
Hebrew words and phrases in Jewish law